Pinkwashing is a portmanteau word which combines "pink" and "whitewashing". The term is most often used to describe various forms of cause marketing.

Pinkwashing may refer to:
Pinkwashing (breast cancer), the promotion of consumer goods and services using the pink ribbon that represents support for breast cancer-related charities
Pinkwashing (LGBT), the promotion of the gay-friendliness of a corporate or political entity in an attempt to downplay or soften aspects of it considered negative